Ahn Jae-wook (born September 12, 1971) is a South Korean actor and singer.

Career
Ahn Jae-wook spent most of his childhood in his hometown, the district of Donam-dong in Seoul, before graduating from Seoul Institute of the Arts, where he majored in theater. After graduating in 1994, Ahn made his acting debut in Song of a Blind Bird, which was based on a real-life story, followed by supporting roles in several 1995–96 television series such as Hotel and Their Embrace. In 1997 he and costar Choi Jin-sil shot to stardom in the highly popular trendy drama Star in My Heart, which reached ratings of over 49%. It not only ignited trends in hairstyle, fashion and products featured in the series, Ahn also became a Korean Wave star, extending his popularity to China, Japan and Southeast Asian countries.

Star in My Heart likewise kick-started Ahn's music career. Forever, which was featured in the series' ending during the concert of his character Kang Min, sold over 700,000 copies, and became the title song of his debut album. He continued to compose and sing over the years, holding numerous concerts in Japan and China, and releasing albums such as Memories and Reds in Ahn Jae-wook.

In 1998, he played lead roles in three films – Rub Love with Lee Ji-eun, Tie a Yellow Ribbon with Kim Hye-soo, and First Kiss with Choi Ji-woo—but did not meet with box office success despite his popularity at the time. He also starred in Garden of Heaven with Lee Eun-ju in 2003, and the Korea-Japan telecinema project Triangle in 2009.

Instead, Ahn focused on the small screen, appearing in over 10 television series from the late 1990s and throughout the 2000s. Among these were Goodbye My Love with Kim Hee-sun, Oh Pil-seung and Bong Soon-young (also known as Oh Feel Young) with Chae Rim, and I Love You (also known as Saranghae) with Seo Ji-hye.

As he entered his forties and his matinee idol status gave way to younger actors, Ahn returned to his stage roots. He played Daniel in Jack the Ripper (a Korean adaptation of the Czech musical ) from 2009 to 2011, then reprised the role in the musical's run in Tokyo, Japan in 2012.

To commemorate the 50th anniversary of broadcaster MBC, Ahn headlined Lights and Shadows in 2011. The sprawling drama, which spotlights Korean show business against the backdrop of history in the 1960s to the 1980s, was number one in its timeslot for 20 consecutive weeks.

Ahn then played the title role in the 2012 Korean staging of Rudolf, a musical about the 1889 Mayerling Incident involving the Crown Prince of Austria.

In February 2013 Ahn underwent brain surgery in the U.S. for a subarachnoid hemorrhage. After resting for a year, Ahn returned to work in April 2014 via the musical Le Roi Soleil. He celebrated his 20th anniversary in entertainment by holding a concert titled One Fine Day in October 2014.

In September 2017, It was confirmed that Ahn will be a fixed cast member in Netflix's variety show Busted!. Ahn's involvement in a drunk driving incident in February 2019 caused him to be omitted in the promotions of Busted's second season - including removal from the opening credits and promotional posters, as well as to skip the already-scheduled musical "Hero".

Personal life
Ahn married musical theatre actress Choi Hyun-joo on June 1, 2015. The couple met in 2014 when they were cast as lovers in the stage musical Rudolf. The couple have a daughter and a son.

Filmography

Television series

Web series

Film

Variety show

Theater
 1995: Baby
 1996: 한평 반짜리 혁명
 1997: Butterflies Are Free
 1998: Guys and Dolls
 2009: Jack the Ripper
 2010: Jack the Ripper
 2010: Rock of Ages
 2011: Jack the Ripper
 2012: Jack the Ripper
 2012–2013: Rudolf
 2014: Le Roi Soleil
 2014–2015: Rudolf
 2022–2023: Dracula as Dracula

Radio program
 2007–2008: Mr. Radio (KBS Cool FM)

Discography

Awards and nominations

References

External links

See also

 
 Contemporary culture of South Korea
 Korean music

Korean Mandopop singers
South Korean pop rock singers
20th-century South Korean male singers
South Korean male musical theatre actors
South Korean male stage actors
South Korean male film actors
South Korean male television actors
Seoul Institute of the Arts alumni
Male actors from Seoul
1971 births
Living people
21st-century South Korean male singers
Singers from Seoul
Best New Actor Paeksang Arts Award (television) winners